Charles B. J. Snyder (November 4, 1860 – November 14, 1945) was an American architect, architectural engineer, and mechanical engineer in the field of urban school building design and construction. He is widely recognized for his leadership, innovation, and transformation of school building construction process, design, and quality during his tenure as Superintendent of School Buildings for the New York City Board of Education between 1891 and 1923.

Family and personal life

Birth 
Snyder was born November 4, 1860, in Stillwater, New York. He was the middle of three children born to George I. Snyder (1834-?) (harness maker) and Charity Ann Snyder (née Shonts) (1834–1919). His two siblings, both sisters, were Ella G. Snyder (1857–1876) and Katy Snyder (b. approx 1865).

Snyder was a member of the Kane Lodge No. 454, Free and Accepted Masons (New York City); the Jerusalem Chapter, No. 8, Royal Arch Masons (New York City),; Order of Harugari, Martha Lodge No. 1,830 of Union Hill, New Jersey; and the Royal Arcanum Huguenot Council, No. 397 (New Rochelle).

Education 
He completed public schooling in Stillwater, New York. In 1879, he arrived in New York City, and worked four years with builders in preparation for his profession. In 1883, he began the practice of architecture.

Snyder earned two credentials from Cooper Union technical schools: Cooper Union Free Night School of Science, Class C — Third-Year: May 28, 1881 — Certificate, Practical Geometry (name of record: "Charles Snyder").; and Cooper Union School of Art, May 28, 1884 — Certificate, Elementary Architectural Drawing (name of record: "Chas. B.J. Snyder").

Marriage and children 
Snyder married Harriet Katharine (or Katherine) de Vries on September 11, 1889, at the home of the bride's parents in Jersey City Heights.
(b. Nov. 30, 1862 - d. May 25, 1927, Brooklyn). They had two sons, Howard Halsey Snyder (b. Oct. 15, 1890, New Rochelle - d. Mar. 1970, Babylon, NY) and Robert Maclay Snyder (b. September 6, 1894, New Rochelle - d. 1945).

Career 
From the mid to late 1880s, Snyder worked with William E. Bishop, a New York City master carpenter. Little is known about Bishop except that he was a lifelong volunteer fireman, holding leadership positions in various fire companies.

Superintendent of School Buildings 
At its last meeting of the school year on July 8, 1891, the New York City Board of Education elected Snyder as Superintendent of Buildings to succeed George W. Debevoise after his resignation. Of the thirteen votes cast, Snyder received twelve. It's not clear how Snyder won the support, but he may have had a connection with the banker Robert Maclay, head of the Board of Education's Building Committee. Snyder named his younger son "Robert Maclay."

While Snyder initially oversaw Manhattan and The Bronx, the 1898 consolidation of Greater New York elevated him to the ultimate role of Superintendent of School Buildings for the entire city.

School design innovations
As Superintendent, Snyder thought of school buildings as civic monuments for a better society. He was concerned with health and safety issues in public schools and focused on fire protection, ventilation, lighting, and classroom size. Snyder used terra cotta blocks in floor construction to improve fireproofing, and large and numerous windows to allow more light and air into the classrooms. He also developed new methods for mechanical air circulation in school buildings. The problem of school design in New York was compounded by the relatively constricted sites which were necessitated by the high cost of land acquisition.

The H-plan design was first implemented by Snyder on a school (PS 165) in 1898 and was inspired by the Hotel de Cluny in Paris, which Snyder had seen in 1896.

In 1896 Snyder began designing his first "H-plan," which provided two side courts. Snyder's H-plan improved the overall environmental quality by, among other things, allowing generous light and fresh air into classrooms. The plan also allowed for grand courtyard entrances. It also provided areas between the wings that were safe for recreation.

The use of steel skeleton framing for buildings over four stories allowed for cheaper and faster construction, as well as an increased span of window openings.
Because of the need to produce many buildings in a short time, Snyder's office improved the design and planning ideas of earlier schools and sometimes used the same basic design for several schools.

Snyder reorganized the Deputy Superintendents so that each was responsible for a single part of the building — such as (i) design and planning, (ii) heating and ventilating, (iii) electricity, (iv) plumbing and drainage, (v) furniture, and (vi) inspection and records — and each reported directly to him.

Notable architecture
Note: Schools are listed by their original designation.

As Superintendent, Snyder is credited with the design of over 400 structural projects — including more than 140 elementary schools. Snyder worked in several styles, including Beaux Arts, English Collegiate Gothic, Jacobean, and Dutch Colonial. He preferred mid-block locations away from busy and polluted avenues. One of his signature motifs was to design spaces for learning that would offer a respite from noisy streets and poverty.

Elementary schools

The Bronx 

 Public School 17; now City Island Museum (190 Fordham St., E. of City Island Ave.)
 PS 27 (519 St. Ann's Ave., btwn. 147th & 148th Sts.) NYC Landmark
 PS 28 (1861 Anthony Avenue, btwn Mt Hope Place and East Tremont Avenue) - a.k.a. The Mount Hope School, a plaque at the entrance verifies that Snyder was the architect, designing it in 1896–7, but the numeric designation on the plaque is altered
 PS 32 in Little Italy area, 183rd and Beaumont- a beautiful red-brick, terra-cotta & gargoyle redstone Gothic structure
 PS 50 172nd and Vyse Ave

Brooklyn 
PS 95, 345 Van Sicklen Street
PS 157, 850 Kent Avenue
PS 133, 375 Butler Street
PS 130, 70 Ocean Parkway
PS 132, 320 Manhattan Avenue
PS 154, 1625 11th Avenue

Manhattan 
 PS 1, Alfred E. Smith School (8 Henry Street); this building featured what some believe was the world's first rooftop playground
 PS 3 (490 Hudson St.); built in 1905-1906 after a previous school at that site had burned down. Now the Charrette School. 
 Public School 9 (historic building) (466 West End Avenue at 82nd St.); PS 9 moved to a new building nearby in 1965, and the old building is now the Mickey Mantle School (PS 811M). 
 PS 11, (320 W 21st St, Chelsea) one of few New York City public schools to have a swimming pool
 PS 17, now PS 212 Midtown West (328 West 48th Street)
 PS 20, now the Rivington House (45 Rivington Street)
 PS 23 (70 Mulberry St., Chinatown), now a community center that houses, among other things, the Chen Dance Center.
 PS 40 (320 E 20th St. 10003)
 PS 42 (71 Hester St., Chinatown)
 PS 61 (610 E 12th St. 10009)
 PS 64 (605 E 9th St., Alphabet City) NYC Landmark
 PS 67 (120 W 46th St., btwn 6th & 7th Aves.), later HS of Performing Arts; later Liberty HS, currently Jacqueline Kennedy Onassis High School NYC Landmark
 PS 90 (228 W 148th St. and 225 W 147th St., Central Harlem), built in 1905, the building had been abandoned for several decades, but artistic graffiti transformed the fence and walls into a shrine honoring several deceased renowned African Americans. On April 4, 2008, the City deeded the property to "West 147th Associates LLC," a condominium entity created in 2004 by the developer. With little fanfare, the developer, L+M Development Partners Inc., commenced construction of mixed-income condominiums; the aim is to refurbish the original facade and keep the "H pattern" design intact. The building is now addressed 217 W 147th St.
PS 95 (Clarkson St., South Village), now HS 560 City As School
PS 109 (215 East 99th St, East Harlem), now El Barrio's ArtSpace PS 109, an affordable housing project for artists; National Register
 PS 110 (285 Delancey St., Lower East Side)
 PS 150; later Hunter College Model School; later MachinrefMetal Trades HS; currently Life Sciences Secondary School (E 96th St.)
 PS 160 (107 Suffolk St., SWC or Rivington St.), now home to Clemente Soto Vélez Cultural and Educational Center
 PS 157 (327 St. Nicholas Ave.), apartments since 1990, about to convert into a co-op National Register
 PS 165 (234 West 109th St.), now housing selective middle school Mott Hall II (serving 6th-8th grades) in addition to the Robert E. Simon School (also called P.S. 165), which is a pre-K through 8 school.
 PS 166 (132 W 89th St.) NYC Landmark
 PS 168 (317 E 104th St.), now a community health facility
 PS 171 (19 E 103rd St.), now PS/IS 171, the Patrick Henry School.  Built 1899.
 PS 186 (521 W 145th St., Hamilton Heights, Harlem, 1/2 block E of Sugar Hill), in 1975 this structure was so run down that parents held protests and the city opened a new school across the street. The Convent Avenue Baptist Church bought it January 1986 with the intention of creating a new space for its M.L. Wilson Boys' Club (current name: Boys & Girls Club of Harlem, Inc.). The mortgage was satisfied February 2006. But, as of 2008, no improvement have been made and the building is still vacant. The contract between the New York County Local Development Corporation and the M.L. Wilson Boys Club required that significant development be completed on the property within three years of the contract date.

Queens 
Public School 66 (85-11 102nd St., Richmond Hill) National Register

Staten Island 
PS 28; Richmondtown Historical Society (276 Center St., Richmondtown) NYC Landmark

High schools

The Bronx 
Morris High School (1110 Boston Rd.) NYC Landmark

Brooklyn 
Erasmus Hall High School (899-925 Flatbush Ave.) NYC Landmark

Manhattan 

Manhattan Trade School for Girls (now School of the Future) (127 E 22nd St)
Stuyvesant High School, the second home (1907 to 1992) (345 E 15th St.) NYC Landmark
Washington Irving High School (40 Irving Pl.).
DeWitt Clinton High School (10th Ave & 58th St.), now Haaren Hall on the campus of John Jay College of Criminal Justice. It was the largest high school building in the United States when it opened in 1903. The interior has since been gutted.
Wadleigh High School for Girls; later Wadleigh JHS 88 (215 W 114th St.) NYC Landmark

Queens 

Newtown High School NYC Landmark
Flushing High School (35-01 Union Street) NYC Landmark, National Register

Staten Island 
Curtis High School NYC Landmark

Structural additions

Brooklyn 
1912 Addition to Girls' High School (Macon Street)

Manhattan 
PS 72, later PS 107, now Burgos Cultural Center (1674 Lexington Ave.), (Stagg, Architect 1879-82; annex, Snyder, 1911–13). NYC Landmark

Staten Island 
PS 4 (4210 Arthur Kill Road, Tottenville)
Curtis High School completed 1904, still standing.

Demolished structures

The Bronx 
24th Ward School; later Evander Childs High School Annex; later Resthaven Nursing Home (225 E. 234th St., bet. Kepler and Katonah Aves.)
PS 31 (425 Grand Concourse at Walton Ave.) former NYC Landmark

Manhattan 
PS 6 (Madison Avenue, Upper East Side)

Professional affiliations
Snyder joined the American Society of Heating and Ventilating Engineers in 1895, served on its Board of Governors from 1900 to 1904, and was elected President in 1907. He joined the American Institute of Architects in 1901 and was elevated to Fellow in 1905.

Retirement 
In 1922, Snyder began openly exploring retirement. He said that he hadn't had a vacation in 18 years and was tired and completely worn-out and that it was time to go fishing. On July 1, 1923, Snyder officially retired. He was succeeded by another noted school architect Snyder helped train: William H. Gompert.

Death 
Snyder died November 14, 1945, with his son, Robert, when they were overcome with natural gas poisoning, or carbon monoxide, or both, in their cottage in Babylon, New York. Apparently, upon retiring for the evening, the Snyders had lit the burners on the range oven to heat the rooms; but during the night the flame had been extinguished, possibly by a draft. The elder Snyder was 85, the son was 51. They both are buried in a family plot in Woodlawn Cemetery in The Bronx, New York City.

Publications and presentations

See also
 New York City Landmarks Preservation Commission
A Tale of Four Schools, a panel discussion moderated with stakeholders of four Snyder projects.

References 
Notes

Further reading

External links 

 National Clearinghouse for Educational Facilities

1860 births
1945 deaths
19th-century American architects
Fellows of the American Institute of Architects
People from Stillwater, New York
Artists from New Rochelle, New York
Superintendents of School Buildings for New York City Department of Education
Cooper Union alumni
20th-century American architects